The Confederate States Secretary of State was the head of the Confederate States State Department from 1861 to 1865 during the American Civil War. There were three people who served the position in this time.

Secretaries of State

See also
United States Secretary of State

References

Foreign relations of the Confederate States of America
Lists of government ministers
Government of the Confederate States of America
1861 establishments in the Confederate States of America